Shadows of the Sea is a 1922 American silent thriller film directed by Alan Crosland and starring Conway Tearle, Doris Kenyon, and Crauford Kent.

Cast
 Conway Tearle as Captain Dick Carson 
 Doris Kenyon as Dorothy Jordan 
 Jack Drumier as Shivering Sam 
 Crauford Kent as Andrews 
 Arthur Housman as Ralph Dean 
 J. Barney Sherry as Dr. Jordan 
 Frankie Mann as Molly 
 Harry J. Lane as 'Red' 
 William Nally as Captain Hobbs

References

Bibliography
 Monaco, James. The Encyclopedia of Film. Perigee Books, 1991.

External links

1922 films
1920s thriller films
American thriller films
Films directed by Alan Crosland
American silent feature films
American black-and-white films
Selznick Pictures films
Seafaring films
1920s American films
Silent adventure films
Silent thriller films